Avraham Harman (November 7, 1914 – February 23, 1992) was an Israeli diplomat and academic administrator. From 1968 to 1983, he was the president of the Hebrew University of Jerusalem.

Biography
Leslie Avraham Harman was born in London in the United Kingdom. He received a law degree from Wadham College, Oxford in 1935. In 1938, he immigrated to Mandate Palestine.

Both Harman's wife Zina Harman and their daughter, Naomi Chazan were elected to the Knesset. He lived in Jerusalem till his death, and is buried in the city.

Diplomatic and academic career
Following Israeli independence in 1948, he was appointed deputy director of the Press and Information Division of the Ministry of Foreign Affairs. In 1949, he was appointed Israel's first consul-general in Montreal, Quebec. In 1950, he worked in the Israeli delegation to the United Nations. From 1953 to 1955, he was the consul-general in New York, New York. From 1959 to 1968, he was Israel's ambassador to the United States.

From 1968 to 1983, he was the president of the Hebrew University of Jerusalem, following Eliahu Eilat and succeeded by Don Patinkin. As President, among other things, he was responsible for the rebuilding and expansion of the original campus of the Hebrew University on Mount Scopus. After 1983, he was appointed Chancellor.

Harman was founding president of the Israel Public Council for Soviet Jewry, a post he held until his death. He received honorary degrees from Yeshiva University, Brandeis University, the Hebrew University, the Weizmann Institute, New York University, Brooklyn College, the Jewish Theological Seminary, Hebrew Union College, Pepperdine University, University of San Francisco and University of Rochester. He was also named an honorary fellow by his alma mater, Wadham College, Oxford.

Commemoration
The Avraham Harman Institute of Contemporary Jewry at the Hebrew University of Jerusalem is named in his honour.

References

1914 births
Lawyers from London
British Jews
Alumni of Wadham College, Oxford
British emigrants to Israel
Jews in Mandatory Palestine
Israeli consuls
Ambassadors of Israel to the United States
Presidents of universities in Israel
1992 deaths
20th-century English lawyers